Sarcoxie Township is a township in Jefferson County, Kansas, USA.  As of the 2000 census, its population was 958.

Geography
Sarcoxie Township covers an area of 31.03 square miles (80.36 square kilometers); of this, 0.14 square miles (0.36 square kilometers) or 0.45 percent is water. The stream of Plum Creek runs through this township.

Adjacent townships
 Union Township (north)
 Tonganoxie Township, Leavenworth County (northeast)
 Reno Township, Leavenworth County (southeast)
 Grant Township, Douglas County (south)
 Rural Township (west)
 Oskaloosa Township (northwest)

Cemeteries
The township contains one cemetery, Hardy Oak.

Major highways
  U.S. Route 24/U.S. Route 59

References
 U.S. Board on Geographic Names (GNIS)
 United States Census Bureau cartographic boundary files

External links
 Township of Sarcoxie
 US-Counties.com
 City-Data.com

Townships in Jefferson County, Kansas
Townships in Kansas